Uma Charan Pattnaik Engineering School (UCPES) previously known as Berhampur Engineering School, named after the great freedom fighter and eminent parliamentarian Late Uma Charan Patnaik, was established in the year 1956. It is located in the Silk-city, at a distance of five km from the Railway Station and three  km from the Bus-stand. The Industries Department, Government of Orissa, took over this institution for better management from private committee on 12 November 1958. This institution is affiliated to the State Council for Technical Education and Vocation Training (SCTE&VT) Orissa, Bhubaneswar and is under the administrative control of Director of Technical Education and training Orissa, Cuttack which comes under the Industries Department, Government of Orissa. Statue of LateUma Charan Patnaik (19.10.1902- 14.02.1961) The institution has a sprawling 49.785 acres area in Kalapuri Mouza in Khata No.16 & 27 in the name of Industries Department.

Academic structure 
The college provides 3-year Diploma Engineering Engineering: civil engineering, computer science engineering, Mechanical engineering, Electrical engineering, chemical engineering, Bio Tech engineering, electronics and telecommunication engineering, a two-year diploma for ITI, +2 holders as lateral entries is also offered. All courses are full-time. Each academic year consists of two semesters and a summer term. The education system is organized around a credit system, which ensures continuous evaluation of a student's performance and provides flexibility to choose courses to suit the student's ability or convenience. Each course is assigned credits depending upon the class hours.

Facilities 
The institution is running in a single campus having two large buildings. The old two storied building houses administrative block along with the departments of Civil Engineering, Mechanical Engineering, Electrical Engineering, drawing halls, class rooms, Edusat hall, Communication Skill Laboratory & Computer Centres. The new three storied building constructed under World Bank Assisted Project accommodates the departments of Computer Science Engineering, Information Technology, Chemical Engineering, Bio Technology & Electronics & Telecommunication Engineering, LRUC hall & Gymnasium etc. The institution has a separate workshop building which houses fitting shop, machine Shop, turner section, welding shop, carpentry shop and smithy. With Two boy's hostel and one Girl's Hostel are available and one each cricket field, basketball court, tennis court and volleyball court are available.

Admission
The intake into Diploma courses is made through the Diploma Entrance Test conducted each year by the government of Odisha. And administrative control of Director of Technical Education and training Orissa, Cuttack

Examination
Registration is required at the beginning of each semester. Students appear for examination for registered courses only. Students are eligible to appear for examinations provided they attend a minimum of 75 per cent of their theory, practical, and sessional classes scheduled during the semester, and per semester having 750 marks but only first Semester or second semester mark is 700,50% of total mark in first and second semester is considered, over all in Three Year Diploma having 3700 marks, and minimum 30% is required for pass.

Events
 EXUBURANCE is the college's cultural extravaganza held annually in March.
 Welcome is the freshers' party.
 Every Year farewell party.
 Celebrate the bishwakarma puja every  year.

Departments 
 Bio Tech Engineering
 Civil Engineering
 Chemical Engineering
 Computer Science and Engineering
 Electrical Engineering
 Electronics and Telecommunication Engineering
 Information Technology Engineering
 Mechanical Engineering
 Math and science department

Eminent faculty members 
A variety of teaching and learning techniques are employed to impart knowledge and  skills to students at Umacharan Patnaik Engineering School.

References

External links 

 BPUT Official website

Engineering colleges in Odisha
Education in Berhampur
1956 establishments in Orissa
Educational institutions established in 1956